Bradmore may refer to:

 Bradmore, Nottinghamshire, Nottinghamshire, England
 Bradmore, West Midlands, Wolverhampton, West Midlands, England

See also
 Bradmore Road, Oxford, England